The 1st Georgia Regiment, or as it was also known, the 1st Georgia was a regiment of the Continental Army, and formed part of the Georgia Line.

History 
On 4 November 1775, the Georgia Regiment was authorised in the Continental Army, and organised from 20 January–28 April 1776 at Savannah, Georgia, consisting of eight companies (the 8th being a rifle company). On 27 February 1776 the regiment joined the Southern Department/Army. Redesignated 5 July 1776 as the 1st Georgia Regiment on formation of the 2nd Georgia and 3rd Georgia Regiments. Assigned 23 December 1777 to the Georgia Brigade, an element of the Southern Department.

In 1777 the regiment was still short of men, mostly in-part due to Georgia being sparsely populated, and the colonel reported that only 10 riflemen of the rifle company had been found, and needed additional soldiers soon. The regiment soon began to lose many of its men to desertion, disease, and combat, but elements of it served on until 1779 and 1780 when the last of the Georgia Line, six officers without men, were captured at Charleston, South Carolina.

The Continental Army’s need for a force in Georgia to counter incursions by Spanish colonists and their Native allies led to the creation of the 1st Georgia Regiment. The city of St. Augustine was at the time controlled by the Spanish and functioned as a base out of which to operate. St. Augustine was the objective of three expeditions to East Florida in which the 1st Georgia Regiment participated led under Colonel McIntosh. Each of these missions were deemed a failure for various issues such as a lack of leadership and organizational abilities of the revolutionary government. While not engaged in battles or expeditions the First Georgia Regiment was defensively stationed around the frontier of the state. 

Captured 12 May 1780 at Charleston, South Carolina, by the British Army during the Siege of Charleston. Redesignated 1 January 1781 as the Georgia Regiment once again. Reorganised and redesignated 1 January 1783 as the Georgia Battalion, and consisted of three companies, along with two troops of cavalry. Furloughed in summer 1783 at Charleston, South Carolina, and disbanded 15 November 1783.

There is very little information on the uniform of the regiment, but the norm seems to have been hunting shirts and gaiter trousers. The regiment was also notably undersupplied and undertrained.

Engagements 
Engagements which the regiment took part in were:

 First Florida Expedition (1776)
 Second Florida Expedition (1777)
 Third Florida Expedition (1778)
 Siege of Savannah (1779)
 Siege of Charleston (1780)

Commanding Officers 
Commanding officers of the regiment were:

 January 7, 1776–16 September 1776, Colonel Lachlan McIntosh
 16 September 1776 – 21 March 1778, Colonel Joseph Habersham
 21 March 1778–????, Colonel Robert Rae

Footnotes

References 

 
 
 
 Digby Smith, Kevin E. Kiley, and Jeremy Black, An Illustrated Encyclopedia of Uniforms of the American War of Independence, 2017 Lorenz Books, London, United Kingdom. .

1st Georgia regiment

Military units and formations established in 1775
Military units and formations disestablished in 1780
Military units and formations established in 1781
Military units and formations disestablished in 1783